Sadunts is a village in the Alagyaz Municipality of the Aragatsotn Province of Armenia.  The prior name derives from caravanserai (Turkish for "inn"). The town is mostly populated by Yazidis.

References 
 (as Karvansara)

Populated places in Aragatsotn Province
Yazidi populated places in Armenia